"Blk & Blu" is a song by British record production duo Chase & Status, featuring vocals from British singer Ed Thomas. It was released independently on 24 March 2014 as the fourth single from their third studio album Brand New Machine. However, the song charted prior to independent release and entered the UK Singles Chart at number 181 upon the album release, rising to number 48 after release. The Preditah remix premiered on DJ Target's BBC Radio 1 show on 8 February 2014, and the Calibre remix premiered on UKF Drum & Bass on 9 February 2014.

Music video
A music video to accompany the release of "Blk & Blu" was first released onto YouTube on 20 February 2014 at a total length of 4 minutes and 41 seconds. It was directed by Rollo Jackson.

Track listing

Credits and personnel
 Vocals – Ed Thomas
 Lyrics – Ed Thomas
 Producer – Chase & Status (Will Kennard and Saul Milton)
 Label – MTA Records, Mercury Records, RAM Records

Chart performance

Weekly charts

Release history

References

2013 songs
2014 singles
Chase & Status songs
Songs written by Will Kennard
Songs written by Saul Milton
Mercury Records singles
RAM Records singles
MTA Records singles
UK garage songs